Oborishte Ridge (Rid Oborishte \'rid o-'bo-ri-shte\) has an elevation of 340 m in the southwest extremity of Breznik Heights, Greenwich Island in the South Shetland Islands, Antarctica. Extending 1.7 km along the southeast coast of Yankee Harbour and 950 m wide.  Ice-free surface area (together with the adjoining Provadiya Hook) .  It surmounting Solis Glacier on the east and Wulfila Glacier on the southeast, and Yankee Harbour on the north and Doris Cove on the south.

The ridge is named after the historic site of Oborishte in central Bulgaria.

Location

Maps
 L.L. Ivanov. Antarctica: Livingston Island and Greenwich, Robert, Snow and Smith Islands. Scale 1:120000 topographic map.  Troyan: Manfred Wörner Foundation, 2009.  
 Antarctic Digital Database (ADD). Scale 1:250000 topographic map of Antarctica. Scientific Committee on Antarctic Research (SCAR). Since 1993, regularly upgraded and updated.
 L.L. Ivanov. Antarctica: Livingston Island and Smith Island. Scale 1:100000 topographic map. Manfred Wörner Foundation, 2017.

Notes

References
Oborishte Ridge. SCAR Composite Antarctic Gazetteer
 Bulgarian Antarctic Gazetteer. Antarctic Place-names Commission. (details in Bulgarian, basic data in English)

External links
 Oborishte Ridge. Copernix satellite image

Ridges of Greenwich Island